Abel Nkhoma (born 1961) is a Zimbabwean long-distance runner. He competed in the marathon at the 1980 Summer Olympics.

References

1961 births
Living people
Athletes (track and field) at the 1980 Summer Olympics
Zimbabwean male long-distance runners
Zimbabwean male marathon runners
Olympic athletes of Zimbabwe
Sportspeople from Kadoma, Zimbabwe